Norwegian Air Norway AS is a Norwegian airline and a fully integrated subsidiary of low-cost airline Norwegian Air Shuttle, using its corporate identity. The airline is based at Oslo Airport, Gardermoen, with its aircraft registered in Norway.

History
Norwegian Air Norway was founded on 17 June 2013, and was subsequently issued an air operator's certificate (AOC). Parent company Norwegian Air Shuttle then registered a single aircraft to Norwegian Air Norway in order to retain the AOC. In October 2018, Norwegian Air Norway was granted an exception by the United States Department of Transportation to operate services to the country ahead of receiving a foreign air carrier permit, although the airline has yet to operate any flights under its associated airline codes as of 2021.

Fleet
, the Norwegian Air Norway fleet comprises the following aircraft:

References

External links
 

Norway
Airlines of Norway
2013 establishments in Norway
Airlines established in 2013
Low-cost carriers